Joannesia princeps, the arara nut-tree or andá-açu, is a species of moderate-sized tree in the family Euphorbiaceae, with a spreading canopy, large alternate and long petioled leaves, and coarse branches. Flowers are monoecious, and fruit is a large drupe. It is endemic to east Minas Gerais, north Espírito Santo to the south of Bahia, Brazil, and threatened by habitat loss.

References

 
 FloraCafe entry

Jatropheae
Flora of Brazil
Vulnerable plants
Taxonomy articles created by Polbot